The 1928 Santa Clara Broncos football team was an American football team that represented Santa Clara University as an independent during the 1928 college football season. In their fourth and final season under head coach Adam Walsh, the Broncos compiled a 5–4 record and outscored opponents by a total of 179 to 106.

Schedule

References

Santa Clara
Santa Clara Broncos football seasons
Santa Clara Broncos football